Gulmi Resunga Airport is a domestic airport under construction in Resunga in Gulmi District in Lumbini Province in Nepal.

History 
Construction of the Airport first started in 2006. The foundation stone was laid by then tourism minister Pradeep Kumar Gyawali.

In June 2018, the first test flight was conducted by Tara Air despite the airport not having blacktopped the runway.

In January 2023, a certification flight was conducted by Tara Air.

Location and Access 
Airport is lies in Simichaur in the District Headquarters of Resunga The airport is spread over 78 Ropanis (39,681 sq m) of land.

Facilities 
The airport resides at an elevation of 5,015 ft (1,529 m) above mean sea level. It has one runway which is 560m in length.

See also 

 List of airports in Nepal

References

Further 

 Udayapur revives airport plan
 Constructing Sagarmatha Airport (in Nepali)

Buildings and structures in Gulmi District
Airports in Nepal
Airports established in 2023
2023 establishments in Nepal